The 2011–12 season was Burnley's second consecutive season in the Championship. They also competed in the FA Cup and the League Cup.

League table

Match details

Football League Championship

FA Cup

Football League Cup

Transfers

In

Out

Squads

First team squad

Development squad & Scholars

Coaching staff

Statistics
Numbers in parentheses denote appearances as substitute.
Players with names struck through and marked  left the club during the playing season.
Players with names in italics and marked * were on loan from another club for the whole of their season with Burnley.
Players listed with no appearances have been in the matchday squad but only as unused substitutes.
Key to positions: GK – Goalkeeper; DF – Defender; MF – Midfielder; FW – Forward

References

Burnley F.C. seasons
Burnley